Vukašin Višnjevac (15 June 1939 – 26 September 2019) was a Yugoslav football manager and player.

Višnjevac played for Sarajevo, Igman Konjic, Sloga Doboj, Istra 1961 and Rovinj, while he managed Rovinj, Istra 1961, Sarajevo, Velež Mostar, Olimpija Ljubljana, Vardar, Vojvodina, Čelik Zenica, Leotar and Sutjeska Nikšić.

He won the 1984–85 Yugoslav Second League (West Division) with Čelik and promoted the club to the Yugoslav First League.

Honours

Manager
Čelik Zenica
Yugoslav Second League (West): 1984–85

References

1939 births
2019 deaths
People from Gacko
Serbs of Bosnia and Herzegovina
Yugoslav footballers
Yugoslav football managers
Serbian football managers
Serbian expatriate football managers
Bosnia and Herzegovina football managers
Bosnia and Herzegovina expatriate football managers
FK Sarajevo players
FK Igman Konjic players
FK Sloga Doboj players
NK Istra 1961 players
NK Rovinj players
Association footballers not categorized by position
NK Istra 1961 managers
FK Sarajevo managers
FK Velež Mostar managers
NK Olimpija Ljubljana (1945–2005) managers
FK Sutjeska Nikšić managers
FK Vardar managers
FC Prishtina managers
NK Čelik Zenica managers
FK Vojvodina managers
FK Leotar managers